Langres is a commune in northeastern France. It is a subprefecture of the department of Haute-Marne, in the region of Grand Est.

History
As the capital of the Romanized Gallic tribe known as the Lingones, it was called Andematunnum, then Lingones, and now Langres.

A hilltop town, Langres was built on a limestone promontory of the same name. This stronghold was originally occupied by the Lingones. At a later date the Romans fortified the town, which they called Andemantunum, located at a strategic crossroads of twelve Roman roads. The first-century Triumphal Gate and the many artefacts exhibited in the museums are remnants of the town's Gallo-Roman history. After the period of invasions, the town prospered in the Middle Ages, due in part to the growing political influence of its bishops. The diocese covered Champagne, the Duchy of Burgundy, and Franche-Comté, and the bishops obtained the right to coin money in the ninth century and to name the military governor of the city in 927. The Bishop of Langres was a duke and peer of France. The troubled 14th and 15th centuries caused the town to strengthen its defenses, which still give the old city its fortified character, and Langres entered a period of royal tutelage. The Renaissance, which returned prosperity to the town, saw the construction of numerous fine civil, religious and military buildings that still stand today. In the 19th century, a "Vauban" citadel was added.

Main sights
Langres has a historic town center surrounded by defensive walls with a dozen towers and seven gates.

The cathedral of Saint-Mammès is a late 12th-century structure dedicated to Mammes of Caesarea, a 3rd-century martyr.

Culture
Langres is home to producers of an AOC-protected cheese of the same name.  It is a soft, pungent cow's milk cheese that is known for its rind, which is washed.

The town was long known for its cutlery industry. Didier Diderot, father of encyclopedist Denis, was a cutler.

A museum called the Denis Diderot House of Enlightenment opened in 2013. This museum, set up in a private mansion from the 16th and 18th centuries, is dedicated to the philosopher Denis Diderot.

Population

Notable people 
Langres was the birthplace of:
 Nicolas Ribonnier (ca.1525–1605), Renaissance architect
 Jeanne Mance (1606–1673), the co-founder of Montreal
 Claude Gillot (1673–1722), painter
 Denis Diderot (1713–1784), the philosopher of the Age of Enlightenment, and the editor-in-chief of the Encyclopédie.
 Étienne Jean Bouchu (1714–1773), metallurgist and Encyclopédiste
 Nicolas Fallet (1746–1801), playwright and journalist 
 Joseph-Philibert Girault de Prangey (1804–1892), photographer and draughtsman
 Jules Violle (1841–1923), physicist and inventor
 Jean Tabourot, who went by the pen name Thoinot Arbeau and wrote Orchésographie, a book on dance and music.

Climate
Located in the north-east quarter of France, Langres is under the influence of both an oceanic climate and a humid continental climate with no dry season.

International relations

Langres  is twinned with:
  Beaconsfield, United Kingdom - since 1995
 Ellwangen, Germany - since 1964
 Abbiategrasso, Italy

See also
Bishopric of Langres
 The Langres war memorial has a sculpture by Georges Saupique

Gallery

References

External links

Catholic Encyclopedia: Diocese of Langres
Langres official website (in French)

Communes of Haute-Marne
Subprefectures in France
Lingones
Gallia Lugdunensis
Champagne (province)